The Cadillac Celestiq is an  electric car made by General Motors' Cadillac division. It will be its flagship sedan, replacing the Cadillac CT6, expected to begin sales for the 2024 model year.

Overview

Cadillac stated it plans to build the Celestiq by hand, investing US$81 million to create a low-volume production line at its Technical Center (GMTC) in Warren, Michigan. Since it was completed in 1956, only concept and show cars have been assembled at GMTC. The Celestiq will be the first vehicle sold to the public that was assembled at GMTC.

One of the vehicle's distinct features is its smart glass roof, manufactured by Research Frontiers. Other reported features include a dashboard-width touchscreen, all-wheel drive and four-wheel steering. It is expected to use more than a hundred 3D printed components. It is anticipated the Celestiq will be fitted with GM's next generation "Ultra Cruise" advanced driver-assistance system, running on Qualcomm's Snapdragon Ride platform.

Like the Cadillac Lyriq, an electric SUV which precedes it, the Celestiq uses GM's Ultium battery technology and BEV3 platform.

Concept
The genesis for a flagship Cadillac sedan has been traced back to concept vehicles including the Ciel (2011), Elmiraj (2013), and Escala (2016), with the last being approved for production prior to Cadillac's pivot to selling electric vehicles exclusively. The Escala was reworked as a halo car for the marque's electrification efforts instead, and the Celestiq concept was derived from it.

After a limited number of planned features and details were released in March 2020 and January 2021 at an "EV Day" event and CES 2021, respectively, pictures of the concept vehicle were not available until July 22, 2022, when Cadillac revealed the Celestiq Show Car, planned for release as a 2025 model year vehicle. The Wall Street Journal reported the Celestiq will be priced near  and will enter limited production by late 2023, with less than 500 built per year.

The designer of the Celestiq, Magalie Debellis, also was responsible for designing the Lyriq, and the two electric vehicles shared design elements such as the front grille and taillamps. Overall, the concept drew inspiration from earlier Cadillac models, including the 1957 Eldorado Brougham and 1930–40 Cadillac V-16, as well as the architecture of Eero Saarinen, who designed GMTC and the Gateway Arch. 

The concept was shown to the public at Monterey Car Week in August 2022, including the annual Pebble Beach Concours d'Elegance. It was awarded for Best Concept and Best Use of Color, Graphics, or Materials at the EyesOn Design awards in September 2022.

Production 
At a press event on October 18, 2022, the production version of the Celestiq was introduced as a 2024 model year vehicle. It retained the overall design of the concept, with changes to the liftback design and the side-view cameras being replaced with conventional mirrors.

The planned low-volume production process allows GM to reduce the cost of production by using additive manufacturing processes and soft tooling for flexibility. In some cases, the number of parts has been reduced to simplify assembly. For example, the main chassis is made from six large castings, manufactured in front/rear/central modules split left/right and welded together. It is estimated that GM invested $81 million to create the Celestiq production line.

Specifications

Powertrain and battery
The motors draw from a high-voltage Ultium traction battery with a total capacity of 111 kW-hr. The battery is composed of individual pouch cells laid horizontally in stacks of varying heights; under the footwells, for instance, the cells are stacked six high, while under the seats, the cells are stacked nine to twelve high. It can be recharged at rates of up to 200 kW (DC).

Chassis
The Celestiq is built on the General Motors BEV3 platform using an aluminum spaceframe with carbon fiber body panels; the door panels are sheet molded composite (SMC) to accommodate embedded sensors. The multilink adaptive air suspension has magnetorheological dampers and the rear wheels are steerable.

Lighting
The headlamps use digital micromirror devices with 1.3 million pixels per side, displaying a startup sequence to welcome the approaching driver, including a projection of the updated Cadillac crest.

Customization
General Motors have announced that many aspects of the car will be customizable, including exterior and interior colors, trim materials, and finishes. As a starting point, Cadillac offers four "Design Inspiration" themes: Magnetic (dark black and blue colors inside and out), Vale (earth tones), Mist (silver exterior with brown leather seats), and Aurora (sporty red themes).

References

External links
Cadillac Celestiq Teaser video at Cadillac.com
 

Cars introduced in 2022
Celestiq
All-wheel-drive vehicles
Sedans
Hatchbacks
Flagship vehicles
Electric concept cars